Richard James Charlesworth (born 26 October 1988) is an English competitive swimmer and distance freestyler who represented Great Britain in the Olympic Games.  He first started swimming with Hemel Hempstead Swimming Club and currently represents Hatfield Swimming Club

At the 2008 Summer Olympics in Beijing, Charlesworth competed in the preliminary heats of the men's 1500-metre freestyle event, finishing with 25th-best time overall.

References
British Swimming athlete profile
British Olympic Association athlete profile

1988 births
Living people
English male swimmers
Olympic swimmers of Great Britain
Sportspeople from Hemel Hempstead
Swimmers at the 2008 Summer Olympics